Édgar Eduardo Mejía Viruete (born 27 July 1988) also known as El Chore, is a Mexican former professional footballer and former manager of Liga MX Femenil club Guadalajara (women).

Club career

Guadalajara
Mejía made his professional debut during the first week of the Clausura 2006 tournament against Toluca. From then on, Mejía became a regular with Chivas. During the Clausura 2007, he earned a starting position over Patricio Araujo. On June 1, 2012, he was transferred on loan for 1 year to Club León. However, he did not make any appearances for Leon during his time at the club. The versatile midfielder made 115 appearances for Chivas.

Loan at Chivas USA
On February 21, 2013, sister club Chivas USA announced they had acquired Mejía and teammates Giovani Casillas and Mario de Luna on loan from CD Guadalajara.

Honours
Guadalajara
Mexican Primera División: Apertura 2006

Juárez
Ascenso MX: Apertura 2015

References

External links

1988 births
Living people
Mexican expatriate footballers
Mexican footballers
C.D. Guadalajara footballers
Club León footballers
Chivas USA players
Club Puebla players
Footballers from Guadalajara, Jalisco
Expatriate soccer players in the United States
Liga MX players
Major League Soccer players
Association football midfielders
Association football defenders